The Catenian Association is a Roman Catholic lay society with around 8,000 members (known as "brothers") in a number of English-speaking countries. Catenian men and their families meet socially to help develop their faith and build lasting friendships.

History
It was founded in Manchester in 1908, through the initiative of Bishop Louis Charles Casartelli, Bishop of Salford, to encourage Catholic professional and business men to associate for mutual self-help, and to develop social and family bonds. Bishop Casartelli had a particular emphasis on Catholic Action.

Organisation
The Catenian Association  has its headquarters in Coventry, in the centre of England, and is administered by three National Councils: Great Britain (also including Ireland for administrative purposes), Australia, and an International Council representing Malta, India, Zimbabwe, Zambia, Bangladesh and the Holy Land. The Association Secretary is the co-ordinating officer for these three bodies which each have their own National Secretary.

In Great Britain, Australia and Malta, Circles are grouped into Provinces with Provincial officers and administration drawn from the Circles. . In countries where Circles are fewer in number or geographically widely spread, the International Council fulfils this role. Each Province elects a Director who is appointed to their National Council for three years. In Great Britain, there are currently 300 local Circles grouped into 21 Provinces. website

Each local Circle bears a name and number, the name being geographical, and the numbers being sequential in order of foundation. Each Circle is led by a President, assisted by Circle officers.  The previous President has the title "Immediate Past President" and holds a special status as such. Each Circle also has a "Provincial Councillor" as official representative to the Province.

Ethos

Catenian life is based on friendship, which is developed through monthly meetings and a varied social programme. The Catenians are a network of Catholic men (often with their wives as guests) who meet regularly to enjoy each other's company and to help and support each other around the world. Membership offers friendship and support to Catholic men (culturally Catholic, contemplative or more orthodox in outlook) at all stages of their lives, whether married or single. The monthly meeting is intended to provide a time for relaxed enjoyment and a light-hearted environment in which friendships flourish. "We enjoy the good times together and help each other through the bad times... Catenians are an international social network that provide an oasis of calm for busy working families."

This friendship is based on a shared faith and is enjoyed by their wives (whether Catholic or not), and their children, and continues after a member's death with widows being supported and involved on a continuing basis. Although a Catholic lay society, it has no political, ecumenical or theological objectives as an association, but is more an association of "Brothers" (as members are termed). Brothers try to help one another, and their families, as much as they can.
Whatever difficulties arise in life, there will be members and their wives committed to help. If a member suffers financial difficulties, a Benevolent Fund can provide assistance.

Activities and Charity
Local Circles arrange activities both for their members and their families. Meals together, barbecues, picnics, visits to the theatre and sporting events are all popular.

Around £300,000 a year is raised for local and national charities by Circles through their Presidents' charities. The Association supports charitable and other good works in a number of ways. It has two chief charitable funds of its own: a welfare fund ('The Benevolent Fund') for the support of its own members and their families, and a bursary fund ('The Bursary Fund') offering financial help to young people in projects contributing to wider society at home and abroad. Bursaries are available to young people who undertake voluntary work in developing countries. Funds are also raised for a number of projects including providing clean water in Africa. At local level, Catenians are active in their parishes, supporting Parish Priests and fellow parishioners.

Golf societies throughout the Association join together in a National Golf Championship week every year and the Catenian Caravan and Camping Fellowship have a wide range of activities.

Regalia
The regalia worn by members is simple. Badges of office are worn by Circle Presidents and officers around the neck, suspended from collars of gold and white ribbon. There are equivalent badges for Provincial officers and national officers. Breast jewels are optionally worn by members on formal occasions, suspended from coloured ribbons, on the breast of the jacket, to indicate membership, long service, and past participation in conferences and structures of the organisation. Regalia sashes are also worn. Regalia has been simplified in modern times, from its more complex origins and a number of Circles have ceased to use them or limit regalia at meetings to the Circle President and any visitors who qualify.

Changing Perceptions
Within the Roman Catholic Church the Catenian Association has sometimes in the past been characterised as having a perceived middle-class exclusivity. This criticism was most famously voiced more than fifty years ago at the Association's own annual conference in 1966 when the Roman Catholic Bishop of Arundel and Brighton, David Cashman, challenged the membership to re-examine its aims and objectives, and criticised it for being "a section of the people of God dressed for dinner and dancing".

Since then, the Association has worked to overcome this perception, with relaxation of its regulations, increased scope for local Circles to admit a wider variety of members, extensive involvement of women as guests at meetings and social events, and attempts to recruit from every kind of social background. In May 2014, Grand President Bob Butler addressed the annual conference in Liverpool, referring to the 1908 founders of the association, and saying "They engaged with the world in which they lived. Surely, they would expect us to engage with the world in which we live?.....Some may be fearful, but I suggest that we have much to gain, and much to offer the Church by moving on."

References

External links
 The Catenians – Official website

Catholic lay organisations